The Bharat-52 gun is a 155mm, 52 caliber towed howitzer manufactured by Bharat Forge, a subsidiary of Kalyani Group.

Bharat-52 is being considered by the Indian Army to fulfill its requirements for towed howitzers.
Kalyani group has also made a strong pitch for supplying heavy weapons to the Saudi Arabian military.

Two gun systems, both developed by Kalyani Group, will be sent to Saudi Arabia for trial evaluation by the Royal Saudi Army.
The guns include the Bharat 52 and the Garuda V2, a 105 mm gun mounted on a light vehicle chassis for added mobility.

References

Artillery of India
Howitzers